Great Kei Local Municipality is an administrative area in the Amathole District of the Eastern Cape in South Africa. The name "Kei" is of Khoi origin, meaning "sand".  The municipality is named after the Great Kei River.

Main places
The 2001 census divided the municipality into the following main places:

Politics 

The municipal council consists of thirteen members elected by mixed-member proportional representation. Seven councillors are elected by first-past-the-post voting in seven wards, while the remaining six are chosen from party lists so that the total number of party representatives is proportional to the number of votes received. In the election of 1 November 2021 the African National Congress (ANC) won a majority of nine seats on the council.
The following table shows the results of the election.

References

External links
 http://www.greatkeilm.gov.za/

Local municipalities of the Amatole District Municipality